EyeToy: Monkey Mania (also known as Saru Eye Toy Oosawagi: Wakki Waki Game Tenkomori!! in Asia, Japan, and Korea) is a party game that requires the EyeToy camera to play. It is based on Ape Escape and the monkeys in the game are guided through 50 minigames. Up to four players can play together.

The game is available with a silver camera or without for those who may already have the EyeToy.

Reception

The game received "mixed" reviews according to the review aggregation website Metacritic.  In Japan, Famitsu gave it a score of one five, one six, and two sevens for a total of 25 out of 40.

See also
 Ape Escape

References

External links
Official UK site
Official Japanese site 

 

2004 video games
Ape Escape games
EyeToy games
Party video games
PlayStation 2 games
PlayStation 2-only games
Video games developed in Japan
Video games with cel-shaded animation
Multiplayer and single-player video games